The Association of Magisterial Officers (AMO) was a trade union representing workers in magistrates' courts in the United Kingdom.

The union was founded in 1975, and later affiliated to the Trades Union Congress.  By 2002, it had 6,344 members.  In 2005, it merged into the Public and Commercial Services Union, which at the time represented slightly fewer court staff.

General Secretaries
1978: Colin Clegg
1993: Rosie Eagleson

References

Public sector trade unions
Trade unions in the United Kingdom
Trade unions established in 1975
Trade unions disestablished in 2005
Trade unions based in London